"Went with the Wind!" is a comedy sketch featured on the eighth episode of the tenth season of The Carol Burnett Show. It originally aired in the United States on CBS on November 13, 1976, and is a parody of the 1939 American historical drama film Gone with the Wind. The sketch was written by two young writers, Rick Hawkins and Liz Sage. In 2009, TV Guide ranked the sketch #53 on its list of "Top 100 Episodes of All Time".

Cast
 Carol Burnett as Starlet O'Hara, a parody of Scarlett O'Hara
 Harvey Korman as Captain Ratt Butler, a parody of Rhett Butler
 Dinah Shore as Melody, a parody of Melanie Hamilton
 Vicki Lawrence as Sissy, a parody of Prissy
 Tim Conway as Brashly, a parody of Ashley Wilkes
 Don Crichton as the Yankee soldier

Premise
Burnett introduces the sketch: 

Part One
ATLANTA, TERRA PLANTATION SOMEWHERE IN GEORGIA: Starlet O'Hara hosts a party and greets her guests. Sissy, her house servant, comes to tell Starlet that Brashly Wilkes has arrived. Starlet, infatuated with the clueless Brashly, opens the door to find him introducing her to his cousin, Melody. Starlet begins to express her love for Brashly but her words quickly turn to anger when he informs her that he's married Melody. Upset, Starlet throws a vase, which is caught by the visiting Captain Ratt Butler. The two share a moment, only to be interrupted by the breakout of a war.

Everyone leaves, save for Melody, who announces that she's in labor. Outside, a fire breaks out after Sissy gives a Yankee soldier a match. As Melody gives birth and a wailing Sissy traipses circles around the couch, Starlet delivers her speech about how she will "never go hungry again".

Part Two
TERRA PLANTATION, ONE WAR LATER. Sissy comes and tells Starlet that the war is over. The Yankee soldier returns to Terra to collect back taxes. Starlet incapacitates the soldier with a chair. Brashly returns and admits that he's broke but Captain Butler has since become a millionaire. Starlet, trying to figure out a way to ask Ratt for the money, quickly pulls down the drapes and goes upstairs to make a dress.

Sissy stalls Ratt briefly, and Starlet descends in her handmade dress, complete with curtain rod, and Ratt professes his love. The Yankee soldier comes to, marries Ratt and Starlet, and is given the back taxes. After an altercation and realizing that Starlet is in love with Brashly, Melody dies but not before she pushes Starlet down the stairs. Brashly leaves, followed by Ratt, who begins to deliver the famous line but Starlet slams the door in his face. Defeated and aimless, Starlet asks Sissy what to do, whereas Sissy slaps her, stating "Frankly, Miss Starlet, I don’t give a damn".

Cultural references
The sketch made various cultural references including Bobbie Gentry's "Ode to Billie Joe", Tony Orlando and Dawn's "Tie a Yellow Ribbon Round the Ole Oak Tree", "Dixie", "Camptown Races", Chicken of the Sea, A Streetcar Named Desire, and tuna casserole.

Curtain dress

The curtain dress was conceptualized and designed by The Carol Burnett Show costumer Bob Mackie. It parodies a scene in Gone With the Wind where Scarlett refashions a set of green curtains into a dress to wear. The script called for the dress to be hanging off Burnett, but Mackie did not find it funny. He asked the art director for a real curtain rod and green fabric and made the dress on a mannequin. Burnett said that she came into costume fittings and when she saw the curtain rod she said it was the most brilliant sight gag ever.

Earlier parodies
Exactly nine years earlier to the day, November 13, 1967, The Carol Burnett Show aired a different spoof entitled "Gone with the Breeze". In that sketch, Burnett's character was named "Scarlett O'Fever". Guest star Richard Chamberlain played "Ratt Butler", and Korman appeared as "Uncle Ben".

On another occasion, during a tribute to the films of MGM, a quickie based on Gone With the Wind was performed by Lawrence as Scarlett and Lyle Waggoner as Rhett.

Legacy
The curtain dress scene was named #2 in TV Guides January 23–29, 1999 list of "The 50 Funniest TV Moments of All Time". The laughter when Burnett descends the staircase was too long—indeed, it was the longest-length audience reaction in the series' entire ten-year run—and had to be edited.

The entire outfit, curtain rod and all, is on display at the Smithsonian Institution. Additionally, in 2009, Mattel released a Starlet doll under the Barbie Celebrity Doll line.

See also
 Gone With the Wind, 1936 novel by Margaret Mitchell

References

External links

 

1976 in American television
Comedy sketches
Parodies of literature
Parodies of films
Works based on Gone with the Wind
Carol Burnett